Afshin Ghotbi (born 8 February 1964 in Tehran) is an Iranian-American football coach who works as head coach of Vancouver FC in the Canadian Premier League.

Early life 
Afshin Ghotbi was born in Tehran. He is the son of a teacher in Iran with whom he left Iran at the age of 13 after his father remarried and moved to Los Angeles, where he has been a resident for more than two decades. He received his BSc qualification in Electrical Engineering from UCLA where he was a member of the football team.

Career

Early years 
Prior to coaching at the professional level, Ghotbi founded one of the best youth football academies named AGSS in Southern California, responsible for the discovery and development of players such as Peter Vagenas and John O'Brien and many more.

USMNT 
He became assistant manager of the USMNT from 1997 to 1998, working under Steve Sampson. He also participated in the USMNT squad for 1998 FIFA World Cup, where he had an emotional moment as his adopted country he worked played against Iran, the country of his origin.

South Korea 
He worked for Korea Republic national football team under Dutchman Guus Hiddink from December 2000 till July 2002 as a football analyst. He continued his journey in Korea by taking the role of an assistant coach of Samsung Bluewings from 2002 to 2004. He returned to Korean National Team, as an assistant coach under Dick Advocaat from October 2005 until July 2006. He continued as an assistant coach for Korea under Dutch head coach Pim Verbeek, who he knew back in 2000 as part of South Korea's 2002 World Cup perpetration, from July 2006 till July 2007.

Return to Iran 

In 2007, he was Head-Coach of Persepolis F.C., an Iran Pro League club, in compliance with the new contract he signed in August 2007. In February 2008 his name was on the shortlist for coaching the Iranian national team, however the job went to Ali Daei.
He ultimately led Persepolis to Iranian Pro league championship in May 2008. Ghotbi left Persepolis in June 2008.

Afshin Ghotbi was re-appointed as the new Persepolis head coach on 3 July 2008, after agreeing to sign a two-year deal following meeting Persepolis officials in Dubai.

Following the session held at Persepolis club on 18 November 2008, Ghotbi announced his resignation on 19 November 2008.

Iranian national team 

After just three weeks after being announced as manager, Mayeli Kohan became the spearhead of a heated dispute between himself and Esteghlal F.C. manager Amir Ghalenoei. This resulted in the IRIFF forcing Mayeli Kohan's resignation as manager of Team Melli. A week later, Afshin Ghotbi agreed to succeed Mayeli Kohan as head coach of the Iranian national team, becoming the first American to take the job. After this appointment, Ghotbi said in an interview "A life dream, a longtime ambition and a journey written in the stars is about to be realized I have to thank all the people around the world who have cheered, supported and inspired me to have this opportunity", Despite taking only one goal and 5 points in 3 matches in 11 days, Iran fell short to qualify for the World Cup 2010.
He continued to coach Team Melli in 2011 AFC Asian Cup qualification where they won 3 matches out of 4 and lost the other one to Jordan Away and in which the team earned 13 points and qualified as the group leaders. With some wonderful results in friendlies (such as winning against Bosnia-Herzegovina and China and South Korea in their land and winning 8 matches in a row in 2010), Ghotbi earned the trust of the fans and qualified for the Asian Cup in Qatar. Later on he finished second in West Asian Football Federation Championship 2010. Iran was the only team in the Asian Cup 2010 competition to win all 3 group matches beating Iraq, North Korea and United Emirates with scoring 6 goals and conceding 1.  Iran faced South Korea in the quarter-finals and lost South Korea by a goal from Yoon Bit-garam in extra time after a 0-0 regulation result.

Move to J. League 
After the Asian Cup, Ghotbi signed three-year contract with Japan's J. League Division 1 side Shimizu S-Pulse. He led the team for the end of 2011 season which ended in the tenth rank. In his second season at the club, his team started the league very successfully but later on they lost their form and finished the league in 9th place with one progress. They also reached the final game of J. League Cup but lost 1–2 to Kashima Antlers. On 30 July 2014, Ghotbi left Shimizu by mutual contest after leaving the club at the 12th place.

Buriram United 
On 24 May 2016, Thai League T1 side Buriram United made an announcement of the appointments of Afshin Ghotbi. He has become the first Asian American foreign head coach of the club. On 28 May, Afshin Ghotbi made his managerial debut for Buriram United in a domestic league game against Nakhon Ratchasima and collected the win with 1-0 result. On 21 August, his contract was terminated after 3 months in charge.

Shijiazhuang Ever Bright 
Ghotbi was appointed by China League One team Shijiazhuang Ever Bright in November 2016. In the 2017 season, the team finished third. After being dismissed in 2018, he returned for a second spell in July 2019. He led the team to promotion into the  Chinese Super League that year. He left by mutual consent in September 2021.

Vancouver FC 
In November 2022, Ghotbi was named the first head coach of Canadian Premier League side Vancouver FC.

Managerial statistics 

Note: win or lose by penalty shoot-out is counted as the draw in time.

Honours 
Persepolis
Iran Pro League: 2007–08

Shimizu S-Pulse

J. League Cup Runner-up: 2012

Shijiazhuang Ever Bright
China League One Runners-up: 2019
China League One Promotion: 2019

Individual 

Iran Football Federation Award
Manager of the year (2007–08), Persepolis

References

External links 

 Official website

Persepolis F.C. managers
Iranian football managers
Iranian expatriate football managers
American people of Iranian descent
Sportspeople of Iranian descent
American soccer coaches
Sportspeople from Tehran
1964 births
Living people
UCLA Henry Samueli School of Engineering and Applied Science alumni
Expatriate football managers in China
Expatriate football managers in Japan
Expatriate football managers in Iran
Expatriate football managers in Thailand
Expatriate football managers in South Korea
J1 League managers
Shimizu S-Pulse managers
2011 AFC Asian Cup managers
Iran national football team managers
UCLA Bruins men's soccer players
LA Galaxy non-playing staff
Glendale High School (Glendale, California) alumni
Cangzhou Mighty Lions F.C. managers
Association footballers not categorized by position
American expatriate soccer coaches
Association football players not categorized by nationality
Persian Gulf Pro League managers
Vancouver FC non-playing staff
Canadian Premier League coaches